RK Ovče Pole (HC RK Ovče Pole) is a team handball club from Sveti Nikole, North Macedonia. The club was founded in 1954 and compete in the Macedonian Handball Super League.

Macedonia's best known handball player Kiril Lazarov started his career at Ovče Pole.

Macedonian Champions 
 1988

References

External links
RFM Profile
Fan Club Forum
Macedonian Handball Federation

Ovce Pole
Sveti Nikole Municipality